Segar is both a surname and a given name. Notable people with the name include:

Surname:
Charlie Segar, bluesman
E. C. Segar (1894–1938), American cartoonist
Joseph Segar (1804–1880), American lawyer
Marc Segar (1974–1997), British autist
William Segar (circa 1564–1633), portrait painter

Given name:
Segar Bastard (1854–1921), English amateur football player and referee